Ryongwŏl station is a small passenger-only railway station in Ryongwŏl-li, Onch'ŏn county, South P'yŏngan province, North Korea, on the Ryonggang Line of the Korean State Railway. A local passenger train, 733/734, operating between Mayŏng on the Ryonggang Line and Kangsŏ on the P'yŏngnam Line, stops at this station.

References

Railway stations in North Korea